Dragon Quest: Young Yangus and the Mysterious Dungeon is a prequel and spin-off to Dragon Quest VIII, developed by Cavia and published by Square Enix as part of the Mystery Dungeon series.

Gameplay
The game utilizes randomly generated dungeons and combat taken in turns. Players must fight through different floors of enemies until they reach a boss monster, which they must defeat to advance through the story. Combat takes place on contact with enemies, with no separate battle screen or menu system. A new feature to the series is the "tension command", that allows players to build up attack power to deliver strong blows upon enemies, though the character cannot move in this state. Later on in the game, and players can capture monsters with a special jug, and use them to attack opponents.
Players may keep three monsters in their possession at any one time, and can be taught to use special abilities by using items and through combat experience. Monsters must reach level four, be given foods they like, and also a weapon before they will assist Yangus, and as they fight more and more, they will combine their strengths with other captured monsters. Players can also utilize a farmhouse late game where monsters can be kept and bred to create new and more powerful monsters. The game also uses cinematic and computer generated scenes with a comic-book style.

Story
The game centers around the character Yangus, who is a main character in Dragon Quest VIII, as a child. Described as a "plump bandit", he becomes involved with his father Yampa's gang of thieves when a mysterious jug is brought home. Though instructed not to touch the jug, Yangus does, and is sucked inside the bottle into another world called "Bottle Land". 
Red, a female bandit from Dragon Quest VIII also appears in this new world, as well as Morrie, Torneko, and a new character named Poppy, and each begins to explore the dungeons of this new land.

Development
A trailer for the game was shown at the Jump Festival in Tokyo, December 2005.
The game's soundtrack features music from Dragon Quest VIII, arranged by Hayato Matsuo, along with a few original compositions by Koichi Sugiyama.

Reception
The game ranked third in Japan for game sales for the week of April 17 to April 23 in 2006. The title sold over 340,000 copies in Japan by November 2006, according to Square Enix's IR, and ranking number 42 in sales overall for the year. The game was noted for its "cartoonish 3D graphics", and its full motion video was also praised. The original art style and cell-shaded graphics were highlighted for praise as well. IGN described the dungeon movement system in the game as "clumsy". The narration of the game was thought to be hilarious, due to the narrators acting out of various characters parts. The protagonist of the game, Young Yangus, would later appear in other games in the Dragon Quest franchise such as Fortune Street in 2011 and Dragon Quest Rivals as part of an event in 2019.

Notes

References

External links 
  

Role-playing video games
Cavia (company) games
Japan-exclusive video games
PlayStation 2 games
PlayStation 2-only games
Video game prequels
Action role-playing video games
2006 video games
Video games developed in Japan
Video games scored by Koichi Sugiyama
Video games using procedural generation
Mystery Dungeon
Shōnen Yangus to Fushigi no Dungeon
Single-player video games